Randeng Daoren is a character in the famed classic Chinese novel Fengshen Yanyi. He was renowned as the Superiorman of Mount Condor, Intuition Cave. His role originated from Dipankara Buddha of Buddhist lore, who was a past enlightened being before the time of Gautama Buddha.

Following the incident with Wenshu Guangfa Tianzun and Taiyi Zhenren, Nezha once again saw an opportunity to strike down his father, Li Jing, and end his great hatred. Before their battle, Randeng Daoren saw Li Jing and immediately told him to hide behind him lest he be killed. Once Nezha appeared directly before Randeng Daoren, Randeng Daoren said, "I thought this problem had been resolved in the Cloud Top Cave. It is not good for you to rekindle your revenge again."

Randeng Daoren thrust Li Jing forward to fight. Because Randeng Daoren had already spat on Li Jing's back - which gave him magical powers - Li Jing was a match for Nezha at last. Nezha, who easily saw the trickery, stabbed his spear at Randeng Daoren; Randeng Daoren easily negated his spear by forming a large white lotus from his own mouth. Once Nezha attempted to attack Randeng Daoren once again, Randeng Daoren had no choice but to unleash a purple cloud from his sleeve—a purple cloud that would trap Nezha within a large burning golden tower. Following this, Randeng Daoren could effectively control Nezha. However, he decided it best to teach the technique to Li Jing lest Nezha rebel again. Thus, Randeng Daoren took his leave after entrusting the Zhou Dynasty to Li Jing, who was now Li the Pagoda Bearer.

The Burning-Lamp Taoist sometimes appears as a door god in Chinese and Taoist temples, usually in partnership with Caishen.

References

 Investiture of the Gods chapter 14

Chinese gods
Investiture of the Gods characters
Fictional monks